Neil S. Whaley (born May 24, 1988) is an American politician who has served in the Mississippi State Senate from the 10th district since 2017.

References

1988 births
Living people
Republican Party Mississippi state senators
21st-century American politicians